Fanny's Journey (original title: Le Voyage de Fanny) is a 2016 French-Belgian children's war drama film co-written and directed by Lola Doillon. The film is inspired by the autobiographical memoir Le journal de Fanny by Fanny Ben-Ami.

Plot

Cast 
 Léonie Souchaud as Fanny
 Fantine Harduin as Erika
 Juliane Lepoureau as Georgette
 Ryan Brodie as Victor
 Anaïs Meiringer as Diane
 Lou Lambrecht as Rachel
 Igor van Dessel as Maurice
 Malonn Lévana as Marie
 Lucien Khoury as Jacques 
 Cécile de France as Madame Forman
 Stéphane De Groodt as Jean
 Elea Körner as Helga 
 Alice D'Hauwe as Ethel
 Jérémie Petrus as Julien

Reception
Variety described it as "a handsome, compelling period piece that deftly portrays events through the eyes of its young protagonists."

Awards
The film won the Best Narrative Audience Award at the Philadelphia Jewish Film Festival CineMondays, and the Best Narrative Audience Award at the Atlanta Jewish Film Festival in 2017.

References

External links 
 , record of official website 
 
 Cineuropa

2016 films
2016 war drama films
2010s children's drama films
2010s French-language films
French war drama films
French children's films
Belgian war drama films
French World War II films
Films about children
Films based on non-fiction books
Films directed by Lola Doillon
Films set in France
Films set in the Alps
Films set in 1943
Films about the French Resistance
Vichy France in fiction
Holocaust films
Drama films based on actual events
World War II films based on actual events
2010s French films
Belgian World War II films
French-language Belgian films